"Hero" is the fourth episode of the first season of the AMC television series Better Call Saul, a spin-off series of Breaking Bad. The episode aired on February 23, 2015, on AMC in the United States. Outside of the United States, the episode premiered on the streaming service Netflix in several countries.

Plot

Opening
In a flashback to 1992, Jimmy McGill and Stevie, a new friend of Jimmy's, leave a bar and Jimmy says his name is Saul Goodman. In an alley, they discover a barely conscious drunk man next to a wallet full of cash. Stevie takes the cash and Jimmy takes the man's Rolex watch. Jimmy estimates the Rolex to be worth more than the wallet, leading Stevie to trade the found money plus additional cash of his own for the watch. After Stevie runs away with the watch, a cheap counterfeit, Jimmy and the "unconscious" man return to Jimmy's residence to split the proceeds of their scam.

Main story
Jimmy gives the Kettlemans the option of hiring him but instead, they offer a bribe if he does not reveal they are in possession of the stolen $1.6 million, and he accepts. Nacho Varga is released from custody and accuses Jimmy of warning the Kettlemans. Jimmy says he warned the family for the sake of the children, and that Nacho should be grateful the warning prevented him from committing kidnapping or murder, for which he would have been charged since he was noticed while surveilling the Kettlemans.

Jimmy enters the money from the Kettlemans in his accounts as a retainer so it appears to be a legitimate payment. He spends the money on a personal makeover that imitates Howard Hamlin’s appearance and a billboard advertisement that shares obvious similarities with Hamlin Hamlin & McGill. Kim Wexler confronts Jimmy, and Howard sues him for trademark infringement. The court rules for HHM and Jimmy is ordered to remove the billboard.

After failing to persuade any news outlets to cover his predicament as a human interest story, Jimmy hires a freelance media team to record his video plea for sympathy. During filming, the worker removing the billboard falls and is held up only by his safety harness. Jimmy climbs up and pulls the worker to safety while passersby watch and record, as does his media team. Howard and Kim realize Jimmy staged the rescue for publicity.

The next day, Jimmy brings Chuck McGill's daily newspapers, but hides the local one that includes a report on the rescue. Chuck becomes suspicious when he notices the missing paper, so he braves exposure to electricity to run to his neighbor's driveway and steal theirs (leaving a $5 bill as payment), which leads to his discovery of Jimmy's scam.

Production 
The episode was written by supervising producer Gennifer Hutchison, who was also a writer and producer on Breaking Bad. It was directed by Colin Bucksey, who directed four episodes of Breaking Bad. This is the first episode chronologically in which the name Saul Goodman is used.

Reception 
Upon airing, the episode received 2.87 million American viewers, and an 18-49 rating of 1.4.

The episode received a positive reception from critics. On Rotten Tomatoes, based on 22 reviews, it received a 95% approval rating with an average score of 8.19 out of 10. The site's consensus reads, "'Hero' marks the essential early evolution of Saul's conning skills, beginning his amusing transformation into the well-known Breaking Bad personality."

Notes

References

External links 
 "Hero" at AMC
 

Better Call Saul (season 1) episodes
Publicity stunts in fiction